In telecommunications, 2VSB is an abbreviation for 2-level vestigial sideband modulation, a transmission method capable of transmitting one bit (21=2) at a time.

Other faster but less rugged forms include 4VSB, 8VSB, and 16VSB.

References

Radio modulation modes